The Romanian Handball League, commonly known as Liga Națională or more recently as Liga Zimbrilor, is the men's top Romanian professional handball league. The league comprises fourteen teams.

History
This sport was first played in Romania in 1920. After a visit in Germany, a few physical education teachers introduced this sport in their classes. 
The Liga Națională was founded in 1933 (in 11 players) and in 1958 in the current format with 7 players. The most successful team in history is Steaua București with 28 titles. The current champions are Dinamo București.

Broadcasting rights
The matches are broadcast by Pro Arena.

Current teams

Teams for season 2020–21

Dinamo București
CSM București
CSA Steaua București
AHC Dobrogea Constanța
Potaissa Turda
CS Minaur Baia Mare
Poli Timișoara 
CSM Focșani 
HC Buzău
CSM Vaslui
CSM Bacău 
CSU Suceava
CSM Făgăraș
CSM Reșița
Magnum Botoșani

Top scorers 
 2017–18:  Gabriel Bujor – HC Vaslui (202)
 2016–17:  Gabriel Bujor – HC Vaslui (222)
 2015–16:  Gabriel Florea – CSA Steaua București (221)
 2013–14:  Claudiu Dediu – ASC Potaissa Turda (195)
 2012–13:  Andrei Grasu  – CS Universitatea Politehnica Timişoara (154)
 2011–12:  Darius Apolzan – Energia Lignitul Pandurii Târgu Jiu (176)
 2010–11:  Gabriel Florea – Energia Lignitul Pandurii Târgu Jiu (200)

Past seasons

Performances by club

EHF coefficient ranking  

For the 2019–20 season, see footnote
9.  (12)  Chempiyanat 1 (25.56)
10.  (8)  Croatian Premijer liga (32.00)
11.  (11)  Liga Națională (30.44)
12.  (10)  Liga NLB (29.33)
13.  (14)  Ukrainian Men's Handball Super League (26.11)

Seasonal Coefficient Ranking Graph :

See also
 Romanian Women's Handball League

References

External links 
 Romanian Handball Federation
 Rankings
 Romanian Handball Club
 Romanian Handball Club
 Romanian Handball Club
 Romanian Handball Club
 Romanian Handball Club

 
Handball competitions in Romania
Romania
Sports leagues in Romania
Professional sports leagues in Romania